The 1999 ASB Classic singles was the singles event of the fourteenth edition of the ASB Classic; a WTA Tier IV tournament and the most prestigious women's tennis tournament held in New Zealand. Dominique Van Roost was the defending champion but lost in the final 6–4, 6–1 against Julie Halard-Decugis.

Seeds

Draw

Finals

Top half

Bottom half

Qualifying

Seeds

Qualifiers

Qualifying draw

First qualifier

Second qualifier

Third qualifier

Fourth qualifier

External links
 ITF tournament edition details

WTA Auckland Open
ASB Classic